Cookesley is a surname. Notable people with the surname include:

Margaret Murray Cookesley (1844–1927), British artist
William Cookesley (1802–1880), British scholar and cleric

See also
Cooksley